The 31st government of Turkey (November 3, 1969 – March 6, 1970) was a government in the history of Turkey. It is known as second Demirel government.

Background 
Justice Party (AP) won the elections held on October 12, 1969. Süleyman Demirel, the leader of the Justice Party, founded the government.

The government
In the list below, the serving period of cabinet members who served only a part of the cabinet's lifespan are shown in the column "Notes".

Aftermath
Justice Party had a majority in the parliament. Soon, however, two opposition groups appeared in the party; those supporting the former Democratic Party politicians and those trying to form a rightist party. Thus, the government ended because of a vote of no confidence in the interpellation voting on February 11, 1970. The next government, however, was again founded by Demirel.

References

Cabinets of Turkey
Justice Party (Turkey) politicians
1969 establishments in Turkey
1970 disestablishments in Turkey
Cabinets established in 1969
Cabinets disestablished in 1970
Members of the 31st government of Turkey
14th parliament of Turkey
Justice Party (Turkey)